Vainakh Democratic Party was a political party of Chechen Republic of Ichkeria. It was founded on 5 May 1990 by Zelimkhan Yandarbiev. The goal of the party was to create a "Chechen independent democratic state".

1990 establishments in Russia
Chechen nationalism
Defunct nationalist parties in Russia
Indigenous rights organizations in Europe
Political parties articles needing expert attention
Political parties of minorities in Russia
Political parties with year of disestablishment missing
Politics of Chechnya
Pro-independence parties in the Soviet Union